P Mohamed Ali, popularly known as Galfar Mohamed Ali is a non-resident Indian businessman hailing from Thalikulam in Thrissur. He is the founder of Galfar Engineering and Contracting Co. Ali is ranked as the twelfth richest Indian ($950 million) in the Persian Gulf region by Arabian Business.com.
 The Oman Government has awarded "Civil Order Grade Three" to him for the contribution to the country.

Career
In 1972, Ali founded Galfar Engineering and Contracting, in the Sultanate of Oman, along with Sheikh Dr. Salim Said Al Fannah Al Araimi and Shiekh Mohamed Rashid Al Fannah Al Araimi. Galfar began as a small construction company and grew to become Oman's largest private sector employer. Galfar Engineering & Contracting SAOG (Galfar) is Oman's largest construction company with EPC capability in Oil & Gas, Roads & Bridges and Civil, Marine Infrastructure and Utilities & Service sectors operating in Oman, other GCC countries as well as India. For over 40 years, Galfar has established itself as the "Preferred Partner in Development" in Oman with a turnover above US$1 Billion. The company has grown steadily over the last four decades, owns a fleet of more than 8000 equipment, employs a workforce of over 25,000 and also prides itself as the largest employer of Omani nationals in the private sector. Galfar has become a vital part of Oman's economic development, as an industry leader in oil and gas, roads and bridges and other vital forms of infrastructure in Oman, and as a multinational company. Galfar has extended out to India and neighbouring Persian Gulf countries such as Kuwait. During his time at Galfar, Ali founded and is currently chair of the Oman Petroleum Alliance, dedicated to maintaining the standards for oil and gas refining and production in Oman.

Achievements, awards and honor
Through his work at Galfar and his numerous social initiatives and projects, Ali has received many accolades from both the Omani government and those abroad. He was awarded an honorary degree of Doctor of Science from Glasgow Caledonian University in 2001. In 2002, he was presented the Oman Civil Order award from the representative of His Majesty Sultan Qaboos, for his contribution to Oman in the business sectors, as well as for his social and education initiatives. Then in 2004 from Atal Bihari Vajpayee, the then Prime Minister of India, Dr. P. Mohamed Ali received the Pravasi Bharatiya Samman award, for promoting the honor and prestige of India. In 2013, he was honoured with the Pravasi Diwas, by the President of India for his contributions to the hospitality sector, as well as his support in developing the Cochin International Airport. This past year, he was awarded the Asian Business Leadership Forum Award (ABLF Award), for Business Courage 2013.

Philanthropy
During his tenure at Galfar, Ali has founded numerous non-profits and social initiatives in an effort to give back not only Oman, but his birth country of India. He founded and pioneered universities and secondary schools such as Yenopoya University & Islamic Academy of Education, CSM Central School, Indian School, the Oman Medical College, and the Caledonian College of Engineering, in both Oman and India. Ali has also created many youth education initiatives and foundations to foster better education in India and the GCC region. The Social Advancement Foundation of India (SAFI) and the P M Foundation were created to help assist families and communities in providing better education to their children and to help communities develop socially and economically through the education of their youth.

Community support
With all this allegations and conviction, the supporters of Ali have recently created a website in his support. They are also constantly supporting him through the social media platforms Facebook, Twitter, YouTube and Slideshare.

Controversies
On 11 January 2014, Ali was one of three men convicted on bribery charges for a deal that extended Ali's Galfar contract with Petroleum Development Oman (PDO). In addition to an OMR 600,000 (~ US$1.56 million) fine, he was sentenced to three years imprisonment. 

Oman's Court of First Instance on Sunday, 9 March 2014 sentenced P Mohammad Ali, former managing director of Galfar Engineering and Contracting SAOG, to 15 years in jail and slapped a fine of OMR 1.7 million (Dh 16.9 million or US$4.61 million) after convicting him in five graft cases in addition to the above sentences.

. He was acquitted from all charges as part of a Royal pardon issued by Sultan Qaboos bin Said and released by on 6 June 2016.

References

Living people
Businesspeople from Thrissur
1949 births
Recipients of Pravasi Bharatiya Samman